Robert or Bob Dunn may refer to:

Sportspeople
 Robert Dunn (footballer) (born 1979), Scottish footballer
 Robert Dunn (handballer) (born 1973), American handball player
 Robbie Dunn (born 1960), Australian former soccer player
 Bob Dunn (American football) (1904–1978), American football player

Politicians
 Robert C. Dunn (1855–1918), American politician
 Robert G. Dunn (1923–2017), American politician
 Robert N. Dunn (1857–1925), Justice of the Idaho Supreme Court 
 Robert W. Dunn (1895–1977), American political activist and economic researcher
 Bob Dunn (politician) (1946–2003), British Conservative Party MP for Dartford, 1979–1997

Others
 Robert Dunn (biologist), American biologist and writer
 Robert Dunn (novelist) (born 1950), American novelist
 Robert Dunn (surgeon) (1799–1877), British physician
 Bob Dunn (cartoonist) (1908–1989), American cartoonist
 Bob Dunn (musician) (1908–1971), pioneer Western swing musician
 Bobby Dunn (1890–1937), comic actor
 Robbie Dunn (musician) (born 1951), Irish folk singer-songwriter 
 Robert 'Dolly' Dunn (1941–2009), Australian former school-teacher, convicted of child molestation in 2001
 Robert F. Dunn (born 1928), American admiral
 Robert Ellis Dunn (1928–1996), American postmodern dance pioneer

See also
 Robert Dunne (disambiguation)
 Robert Done (1904–1982), English footballer
 Robert Donne (born 1967), guitarist